Arkansas Highway 365 (AR 365 and Hwy. 365) is a north–south state highway in Central Arkansas. The route of  runs from US 65B/US 79B in Pine Bluff north through Little Rock to US 65B/AR 60 in Conway. The route is a redesignation of former U.S. Route 65, which has since been rerouted onto various Interstate highways through the area. Portions of Highway 365 in Jefferson County are former alignments of the Dollarway Road, which was the longest paved concrete road upon completion in 1913.

Route description

As a former US Highway, the route passes through many historic districts and has many junctions. The route begins at US 65B/US 79B (the Martha Mitchell Expressway) in northwest Pine Bluff near the University of Arkansas at Pine Bluff and runs northwest. Highway 365 is known as Dollarway Road in this part of Pine Bluff as it follows the original routing of the Dollarway Road, a 1913 paving project that gave Jefferson County the longest continuous concrete road in the nation at the time. Highway 365 meets its spur route further northwest, the spur connects Highway 365 to Interstate 530/US 65 and US 270. Now entering White Hall, Highway 365 passes the historic Bellingrath House and intersects Highway 256 near the Pine Bluff Arsenal.

Further northwest, Highway 365 continues parallel to I-530/US 65 to Redfield where the route passes original Dollarway Pavement. This segment is preserved by its listing on the National Register of Historic Places. The route briefly enters Grant County before entering Pulaski County south of Hensley.

Upon entering Pulaski County, Highway 365 passes through Hensley, Woodson, Wrightsville and Tafton before passing the Hanger Cotton Gin in Sweet Home. The route next enters Little Rock where it junctions with I-440 before becoming Roosevelt Road. Highway 365 passes Little Rock National Cemetery before intersecting Interstate 30/US 65/US 167 at a frontage road interchange. Roosevelt Road serves Main Street before forming a northbound concurrency with US 70/US 67 along Broadway Street. This segment of road passes many historic properties in addition to Interstate 630. Highway 365 crosses over the Arkansas River into North Little Rock and breaks from US 70/US 67 to the west near Dickey-Stephens Park. Highway 365 passes over the railyard, intersecting Highway 100 becoming Pike Avenue to the north.
Highway 365 intersects Interstate 40/US 65 before passing Camp Robinson. The route runs along I-40/US 65 until crossing over near Maumelle. After a junction with Maumelle Boulevard, Highway 365 continues north along the Arkansas River into Faulkner County. The highway intersects Highway 89 in Mayflower near Lake Conway. Highway 365 continues along I-40/US 65 into south Conway where it terminates at US 65B/Highway 60.

Major intersections
Mile markers reset at some concurrencies.

|-
| colspan=5 align=center |  concurrency north, 
|-

Pine Bluff spur route

Arkansas Highway 365 Spur is a  spur route from White Hall to Pine Bluff. It connects US 270 and I-530 to AR 365.  It is a former route of U.S. 270 and its predecessor, Arkansas Highway 6.

See also 

 Dollarway Road
 List of state highways in Arkansas

Notes

References

External links

 

Conway, Arkansas
North Little Rock, Arkansas
365
Transportation in Faulkner County, Arkansas
Transportation in Grant County, Arkansas
Transportation in Jefferson County, Arkansas
Transportation in Little Rock, Arkansas
Transportation in Pine Bluff, Arkansas
Transportation in Pulaski County, Arkansas
Transportation in Redfield, Arkansas
U.S. Route 65